Malik Shaukat Ali is a Pakistani politician who had been a member of the Provincial Assembly of Khyber Pakhtunkhwa since August 2018 till January 2023.

Political career
He was elected to the Provincial Assembly of Khyber Pakhtunkhwa as a candidate of Pakistan Tehreek-e-Insaf from Constituency PK-48 (Mardan-I) in 2018 Pakistani general election. and elected Chairman De dak of Distt Mardan. he is koni morata and konatawar politician in Mardan. also Chairman of the standing committee of irrigation Department .

References

Living people
Pakistan Tehreek-e-Insaf MPAs (Khyber Pakhtunkhwa)
Year of birth missing (living people)
Ajmal Khan PA Malik SHAUKAT ALI ------------- Advise to the Admin PLs Update The scheme approval in ADP for Pk-48 as soon as well thanks